Sir John Helias Finnie McEwen, 1st Baronet (21 June 1894 – 19 April 1962), also known as Jock McEwen, was a British Unionist politician who served in the House of Commons as Conservative Member of Parliament for Berwick and Haddington from the 1931 to 1945 general elections.

Early life
Sir John McEwen was the son of Robert Finnie McEwen (born 1861) of Marchmont, Berwickshire, and Bardrochat, F.S.A.Scot., Deputy Lieutenant and Justice of the Peace for Berwickshire, by Mary Frances, daughter of R. H. D. Dundas. His sister, Katherine Isobel McEwen, married Roger Lumley, 11th Earl of Scarbrough, on 12 July 1922 at St Margaret's, Westminster, and had five children with him.

He was educated at Eton College and Trinity College, Cambridge.

Career
During the First World War, he served in the Cameron Highlanders, being promoted captain in 1915. He transferred to the Royal Army Flying Corps and was later a prisoner of war. After the war, he joined the Diplomatic Service, and in 1920, was 3rd Secretary; 2nd Secretary in 1925, serving in the London Foreign Office, Athens and Rome.

In the 1929 general election, he contested the seat of Berwick-upon-Tweed and Haddington for the Unionist Party, but failed. However, two years later he was elected to the House of Commons as Conservative Member of Parliament (MP) for Berwick and Haddington at the 1931 general election, and held the seat until the 1945 general election, when he was defeated.

McEwen served under Neville Chamberlain as Assistant Government Whip (1938–39), Under-Secretary of State for Scotland (1939 to 1940), and under Winston Churchill as a Lord of the Treasury (1942 to 1944). He was Chairman of the Conservative Members' Committee in the House of Commons (December 1944 – June 1945).

Baronetcy
In 1953, he was created a baronet by the Queen, of Marchmont in the County of Berwick and Bardrochat in the County of Ayr. Upon his death in 1962, his title passed to his eldest son, Sir James.  Upon Sir James' death in 1971, his title passed to his brother and Sir John's second son, Sir Robert, as Sir James had three daughters, but no sons. The current holder of the title is his grandson, Sir John Roderick Hugh McEwen, 5th Baronet (born 1965).

Personal life

In 1923, McEwen married Brigid Mary Lindley (d. 1971), daughter of Sir Francis Oswald Lindley (1872–1950), the British diplomat, and granddaughter of botanist and illustrator John Lindley, who in 1840 was instrumental in saving The Royal Botanic Gardens at Kew from destruction. The raised their family at Marchmont House on the east side of the small town of Greenlaw, Scotland. Together they had seven children, including:
Sir James Napier Finnie McEwen of Marchmont and Bardrochat, 2nd Bt. (1924–1971), who married Clare Rosemary Sandars (b. 1934)
Sir Robert Lindley McEwen of Marchmont and Bardrochat, 3rd Bt. (1926–1980), who married Brigid Cecilia Laver, daughter of James Laver and Veronica Turleigh
Christian Mary McEwen (1929–2006), who married Frederick Fermor-Hesketh, 2nd Baron Hesketh (1916–1955).
Roderick McEwen (1932–1982), a folk singer who married Romana von Hofmannsthal (1935–2014), daughter of Ava Alice Muriel Astor and her second husband, Raimund von Hofmannsthal.
Alexander Dundas McEwen (1935–2008), a musician who married Cecilia Gräfin von Weikersheim
David Fraser McEwen (1938–1976)
John Sebastian McEwen (b. 1942)

He died in April 1962, aged 67, and was succeeded in the baronetcy by his eldest son James.

Notes

References
Kidd, Charles, Williamson, David (editors). Debrett's Peerage and Baronetage (1990 edition). New York: St Martin's Press, 1990.

External links 
 

1894 births
1962 deaths
Alumni of Trinity College, Cambridge
Baronets in the Baronetage of the United Kingdom
British Army personnel of World War I
Chairmen of the 1922 Committee
Members of the Parliament of the United Kingdom for Scottish constituencies
Ministers in the Churchill wartime government, 1940–1945
Politics of East Lothian
Politics of the Scottish Borders
Queen's Own Cameron Highlanders officers
Scottish diplomats
Scottish knights
UK MPs 1931–1935
UK MPs 1935–1945
Unionist Party (Scotland) MPs
Ministers in the Chamberlain wartime government, 1939–1940
People educated at Eton College
Presidents of the Saltire Society